Gulabi means "rose" in Telugu, Kannada and some other languages and may refer to:
 Gulabi (1995 film), a 1995 Telugu film
 Gulabi (2014 film), a 2014 Marathi film
 Yerra Gulabilu, a 1979 Telugu film
 Gulabi Talkies, a 2008 Kannada film
 Gulabi Bagh, a residential area in northern Delhi, India
 Gulabi Gang, an Indian women vigilante group
 Gulabi (grape), another name for the wine and table grape Black Muscat